Carlow is a town in Ireland.

Carlow may also refer to:

Ireland
County Carlow

Parliament of Ireland (1800)
 Old Leighlin (Parliament of Ireland constituency) (????–1800)
 Carlow Borough (Parliament of Ireland constituency) (1613–1800)
 Carlow County (Parliament of Ireland constituency)

House of Commons of the United Kingdom (1801–1922) and First Dáil 1918
 Carlow Borough (UK Parliament constituency) (1801–1885)
 Carlow County (UK Parliament constituency) (1801–1922)

Dáil Éireann (1921–present)
 Carlow–Kilkenny (Dáil constituency) (1921–1937, 1948– )
 Carlow–Kildare (Dáil constituency) (1937–1948)

Others
Carlow, Germany
Carlow, Missouri
F.C. Carlow
Carlow University

See also

Carlo (name)
Carlon